Chokkeeswarar Temple or Kousikeswarar temple is a Hindu temple located in Kancheepuram, Tamil Nadu, India. It is one of the protected monuments in Tamil Nadu declared by Archaeological Survey of India. The temple was built by Cholas in the 9th century CE.

References

Photogallery

 

Hindu temples in Kanchipuram
9th-century Hindu temples